Man on the Prowl may refer to:
 "Man on the Prowl" (song), a song by Queen
 Man on the Prowl (film), a 1957 American crime film